Hubert Rouger (October 6, 1875, Calvisson (Gard) – 21 September 1958, Nîmes) was a French politician and socialist activist.

First a winemaker, in 1905 he became director of a printing cooperative in Nîmes. A socialist activist, he contributed to numerous newspapers and magazines.

Councilor in 1908, then Deputy in 1909, he became mayor of Nîmes from 1925 to 1940. In 1919 he was also general councillor. He served as the SFIO deputy of the Gard department from 1910 to 1919 and from 1924 to 1940. He was secretary of the House from 1924 to 1928 and Questor in 1936.

References

External links
National Assembly page

1875 births
1958 deaths
People from Gard
Politicians from Occitania (administrative region)
French Section of the Workers' International politicians
Members of the 10th Chamber of Deputies of the French Third Republic
Members of the 11th Chamber of Deputies of the French Third Republic
Members of the 13th Chamber of Deputies of the French Third Republic
Members of the 14th Chamber of Deputies of the French Third Republic
Members of the 15th Chamber of Deputies of the French Third Republic
Members of the 16th Chamber of Deputies of the French Third Republic